Daleville is a small village located in Covington Township in Lackawanna County, Pennsylvania, United States.

Location
Daleville, like most villages in Pennsylvania, is loosely defined by local residents, although its generally agreed-upon center is at the intersection of Route 502 and Route 435 in Covington Township.

References

Unincorporated communities in Lackawanna County, Pennsylvania
Unincorporated communities in Pennsylvania